This is a list of past arrangements of Canada's electoral districts. Each district sends one member to the House of Commons of Canada. In 1999 and 2003, the Legislative Assembly of Ontario was elected using the same districts within that province. 96 of Ontario's 107 provincial electoral districts, roughly those outside Northern Ontario, remain coterminous with their federal counterparts.

Federal electoral districts in Canada are re-adjusted every ten years based on the Canadian census and proscribed by various constitutional seat guarantees, including the use of a Grandfather clause, for Quebec, the Central Prairies and the Maritime provinces, with the essential proportions between the remaining provinces being "locked" no matter any further changes in relative population as have already occurred. Any major changes to the status quo, if proposed, would require constitutional amendments approved by seven out of ten provinces with two-thirds of the population to ratify constitutional changes allowing changes in the existing imbalance of seats between various provinces. During the 2012 federal electoral redistribution, an attempt was made to get around this by adding additional seats. These 30 new seats are the largest increase in the number of seats at any single redistribution since confederation.

Provincial allocations

List
List of Canadian electoral districts (1867–1871) - 181 seats
List of Canadian electoral districts (1872–1873) - 185 seats
List of Canadian electoral districts (1872–1873) - 200 seats
List of Canadian electoral districts (1873–1882) - 206 seats
List of Canadian electoral districts (1882–1886) - 211 seats
List of Canadian electoral districts (1886–1892) - 215 seats
List of Canadian electoral districts (1892–1903) - 213 seats
List of Canadian electoral districts (1903–1907) - 214 seats
List of Canadian electoral districts (1907–1914) - 221 seats
List of Canadian electoral districts (1914–1924) - 235 seats
List of Canadian electoral districts (1924–1933) - 245 seats
List of Canadian electoral districts (1933–1947) - 245 seats
List of Canadian electoral districts (1947–1952) - 262 seats
List of Canadian electoral districts (1952–1966) - 265 seats
List of Canadian electoral districts (1966–1976) - 264 seats
List of Canadian electoral districts (1976–1987) - 282 seats
List of Canadian electoral districts (1987–1996) - 295 seats
List of Canadian electoral districts (1996–2003) - 301 seats
List of Canadian electoral districts (2003–2013) - 308 seats
List of Canadian electoral districts 2013–present - 338 seats

See also

 List of Canadian federal parliaments
 List of Canadian federal general elections

External links
 Elections Canada - electoral redistribution <- dead link
Parliament of Canada: History of the Federal Electoral Ridings since 1867